The white-headed petrel (Pterodroma lessonii), also known as the white-headed fulmar, is a species of seabird in the petrel family, Procellariidae.

White-headed petrels breed alone or in colonies in burrows dug among tussocks and herbfields on subantarctic islands.

Diet
They appear to feed pelagically on cephalopods and crustaceans.

Description
The white-headed petrel distinct with a pale white head and prominent dark eye patch. It has long narrow wings and long pointed tail. The upper surface is pale grey which is contrasting with darker grey on the upper wings and the rump. The underside is mostly white. The bill is stout black with a large sharp hook. Green glands are prominent. The legs are pinkish to whitish with black patches on the toes.

Voice
The calls are mainly higher-pitched shrill whistles ti-ti-ti or wik-wik-wik and lower-pitched moans ooo-er and or-wik sounds.

References

 Marchant and Higgins. (1990). Handbook of Australian, New Zealand and Antarctic Birds. Vol.1. Oxford University Press: Melbourne.

External links
 
 BirdLife Species Factsheet

white-headed petrel
Birds of the Indian Ocean
Birds of subantarctic islands
white-headed petrel
white-headed petrel